Wrestling at the 2012 Summer Olympics were held between 5 and 12 August, the final day of the Games, at ExCeL London. It was split into two disciplines, Freestyle and Greco-Roman which were further divided into different weight categories. Men competed in both disciplines whereas women only took part in the freestyle events, with 18 gold medals awarded. Wrestling has been contested at every modern Summer Olympic Games, except Paris 1900.

Competition format
19 men or 18 women competed in each division, plus 6 others allocated either to the host country or by the tripartite commission into divisions yet to be determined prior to the Olympics. Wrestlers determined by lot competed in qualification rounds to reduce the number to 16, thereafter proceeding by simple knockout to determine the finalists who competed for gold and silver. The two groups of wrestlers respectively defeated in the 3 or 4 bouts of the two finalists competed in two serial elimination repechages, with the victor in each repechage being awarded bronze.

Competition schedule
All times are British Summer Time (UTC+1)

Men's Greco-Roman

Women's freestyle

Men's freestyle

Qualification

Medalists

Men's freestyle

Men's Greco-Roman

Women's freestyle

 Besik Kudukhov of Russia won the silver medal, and while a retest of his 2012 sample tested positive for banned substances in 2016, the IOC closed the proceedings after learning that Kudukhov died in a car accident in December 2013.
 Soslan Tigiev of Uzbekistan originally won the bronze medal, but he was disqualified in 2016 after a retest of his 2012 sample tested positive for banned substances.
 Davit Modzmanashvili of Georgia originally won the silver medal, but was disqualified in January 2019 after a retest of his 2012 sample tested positive for banned substances. Artur Taymazov of Uzbekistan originally won the gold medal, but was disqualified in July 2019 after a retest of his 2012 sample tested positive for banned substances.

Medal table

Participating nations
343 wrestlers from 71 nations participated at the 2012 Olympics

References

External links

 
 
 
 International Federation of Associated Wrestling Styles

 
2012 Summer Olympics events
2012
2012 in sport wrestling
Wrestling